Oomai Vizhigal (Gouged eyes) is an Indian 1986 Tamil-language crime thriller film directed by R. Aravindraj. The film stars Vijayakanth, Arun Pandian, Karthik, Chandrasekhar and Jaishankar, along with Ravichandran and Malaysia Vasudevan in negative role. It was released on 15 August 1986 and completed more than 150 days in theatres. The film was shot and released in Cinemascope.

Plot 
A group of college girls, driving a light blue matador, arrive at Chola Picnic Village. They book a hotel room with a picnic spot. At night they go out to the beach, light a bonfire, and enjoy singing and dancing. After the song ends, the girls return to the hotel. One of the girls, Vasanthi, separates from the group. She comes across a pi-shaped bell stand and rings it three times. A man, P.R.K, appears riding on a carriage. He looks into her eyes, and rides Vasanthi down, grabbing her hair and kidnapping her.

The next scene shows Raja entering the Chola Picnic Village. He takes some photos and comes across the pi-shaped bell stand. A beldam is found to sit below it, and he snaps a photo of her. Wandering farther, he finds a priest and introduces himself as Assistant Editor for the Dhinamurasu Magazine. Raja asks about a girl's body, that four to five days ago, was found floating by the Picnic Village's beach. He says that the police reported the murder as a suicide and that he would like some clarifications. The priest refuses to answer, and Raja takes a photo of him. Lakshmana, the younger brother of P.R.K, shows up, smoking a cigarette. Raja leaves.

Chandran is the editor of the Dhinamurasu Magazine. He and Raja develop the photos and Chandran asks Raja how he is getting such sensational news. Raja tells Chandran he has a source in the suspect's house. Her name is Uma, and she is a stenographer. The suspect is none other than MLA Sattanathan. The phone rings in the MLA's house and Velu asks Uma to answer the phone. She picks up the phone and says that a person named P.R.K wants to talk with MLA. Uma overhears their conversation through her phone. P.R.K tells Sattanathan that an editor came to Picnic Village to inquire about the girl's death. Sattanathan says that he will take care of it.

The next morning, Chandran receives a phone call at his office from an inspector who asks why the newspaper is carrying on an unnecessary investigation. Chandra tells him to mind his words. Vijay, a friend of Raja, joins the magazine. Raja and Vijay stay in Devi's house for rent. The next day, Raja brings Uma's blind father and leaves in her house. There Devi is found seating. He says to her that in two-three days he wants some clarification's regarding the Picnic Village. Vijay and Devi were in love as well as Raja and Uma. At the birthday of Uma, Uma was killed by MLA in front of Raja. The case is sent to DSP Deenathayalan for investigation.

Then the scene shifts to a newly married couple, Ramesh and Shanthi, honeymooning at Chola Picnic Village. They spend the time merrily, but during that time they are being watched by the beldam. By the time Maamarathu poo song finishes, it becomes night and when the couples are involved in a romance in the hotel room, P.R.K comes and makes Karthik fall down unconscious. Then Shanthi escapes from the village, where she is being helped by a passerby whose car suddenly stops. When P.R.K opens the gate of the village and approaches her to kill her the car starts and that passerby admit her at a hospital. He also informs Vijay about a girl who was coming undressed from the village and he has admitted her to a hospital. By the time Raja arrives there, one of Sattanathan's people goes there to kill Shanthi. He hides in Shanthi's room to kill her. Raja comes there in time and he is stabbed by that thug. Raja also kills that thug and brings Shanthi to DSP's house and dies there. Vijay gets disheartened on seeing this. Then Peter, Ramesh, and Vijay all join hands in order to know the reason why P.R.K does this. After this P.R.K gets everyone and chains them. He also reveals that he loved someone, especially her eyes but she cheated, so he wanted to take eyes from the girls he sees, actually, Beldam is his stepmother who gives him info about the girls. At last, DSP gets to know about this and punishes everyone. Ramesh and Shanthi rejoin thus making the end of silent eyes.

Cast 

 Vijayakanth as DSP Deenadayalan
 Arun Pandian as Vijay
 Chandrasekhar as Raja
 Jaishankar as Chandran
 Ravichandran as P.R.K
 Karthik as Ramesh
 Srividya as Chandran's wife
 Saritha as Sumathi
 Kokila as Devi, Vijay's lover
 Malaysia Vasudevan as MLA Sattanathan
 Senthil
 Ilavarasi as Selvi Uma, Raja's lover
 Kishmu as Godhandaraman
 Visu as Rathnasabapathy
 Sangeeta as Asha, P.R.K's lover
 Thengai Srinivasan as Devi's father
 Sachu as Devi's mother
 Thyagu as Velu
 Kumarimuthu
 Film News Anandan as the press photographer
 Diamond Babu as the press photographer
 Loose Mohan as Samarasam
 Sasikala as Shanti, Ramesh's wife (guest appearance)
 Meesai Murugesan
 Disco Shanti in an item number as Vasanthi
 S R Janaki as PRK's foster mother

Production 

Oomai Vizhigal was inspired by a series of murders that took place in a tribal village in Tamil Nadu. It was the first film edited by G. Jayachandran.

Soundtrack 
The music was composed by Manoj–Gyan and additional music by Aabavanan; the latter also wrote the lyrics.

Reception 
Jayamanmadhan of Kalki wrote it is great to keep the suspense alive for eighteen reels by stirring up curiosity for what is next.

References

External links 
 

1980s crime thriller films
1980s mystery thriller films
1980s Tamil-language films
1986 directorial debut films
1986 films
Fictional portrayals of the Tamil Nadu Police
Films about adultery in India
Films about journalism
Films about journalists
Films about newspaper publishing
Films about organised crime in India
Films about rape in India
Films directed by R. Aravindraj
Films scored by Manoj–Gyan
Films set on beaches
Indian buddy films
Indian crime thriller films
Indian mystery thriller films
Journalism adapted into films
Murder mystery films
Procedural films